

Herbert Fritz (27 October 1916 – 11 October 1996) was a German general in the Bundeswehr. During World War II, he served as an officer in the Wehrmacht and was a recipient of the Knight's Cross of the Iron Cross of Nazi Germany.

Awards and decorations
 German Cross in Gold on 14 February 1942 as Leutnant in the 4./MG-Gebirgsjäger-Regiment 13
 Knight's Cross of the Iron Cross on 17 March 1944 as Hauptmann and chief of the 16./Gebirgsjäger-Regiment 13

References

 
 

1916 births
1996 deaths
Bundeswehr generals
Gebirgsjäger of World War II
Recipients of the Gold German Cross
Recipients of the Knight's Cross of the Iron Cross
Military personnel from Düsseldorf
Brigadier generals of the German Army